Georg Friedrich Alexan (born Georg Kupfermann on 12 July 1901 in Mannheim; died on 11 January 1994 in Dornum) was a Jewish German journalist, best remembered as the editor-in-chief of the East German newspaper USA in Wort und Bild.

References

20th-century German Jews
1901 births
1994 deaths
Writers from Mannheim
German newspaper editors
20th-century German journalists